Duane Bobick  (born August 24, 1950) is a retired boxer from the United States. As an amateur he won the gold medal at the 1971 Pan American Games and fought at the 1972 Olympics. He then turned professional in 1973 and retired in 1979 with a record of 48 wins (42 by knockout) and four losses, all by knockout.

Amateur career
Bobick was part of a boxing family and grew up with the sport in the 1960s. A good puncher who developed well early by virtue of countless hours in the gym and ring, Bobick had an outstanding amateur career that included a win over Teófilo Stevenson at the 1971 Pan American Games. Bobick added another future champion to his list when he beat Larry Holmes to be named to the 1972 U.S. Olympic boxing team. But lurking on Bobick's amateur record were two devastating second-round one-punch knockout losses at the hands of future heavyweight contender Ron Lyle. The first time, Lyle dispatched of him at the national AAU quarterfinals. The second time, fighting for a spot on the national team, Bobick was dropped with a straight right at 30 seconds of the second round, and was unconscious in the ring for over five minutes.

While being an amateur Bobick served as a quartermaster in the U.S. Navy. He was a three-time Navy Heavyweight Champion, two-time All-Service Heavyweight Champion and two-time International Military champion. He was touted as a rising star at this early stage, and may have been overconfident as he met Stevenson again at the 1972 Olympics. The fight was even after two rounds with Stevenson getting the edge in round one and Bobick rallying in round two. In the third round, Bobick fell victim to a nemesis that would bedevil him for the rest of his boxing career, the overhand right. Stunned, floored and eventually defenseless, Bobick was pounded by the Cuban champion until the bout was stopped; this was Bobick's last bout as an amateur. By that time he had a record of 93 wins (60 by KO) and 10 losses.

Highlights
 All-Navy Championships, Mare Island, California, April 1971:
Finals: Defeated Rick Harris KO 2 
 Inter-service Championships, Mare Island, California, April 1971:
1/2: Defeated Kenneth Hassan KO 1
Finals: Defeated Louis Slaughter by decision
 National Championships, New Orleans, Louisiana, April–May 1971:
1/16: Defeated William Anderson KO 2 
1/8: Defeated Michael Weaver KO 1
1/4: Defeated Don Nelson KO 1
1/2: Defeated Fred Houpe KO 2
Finals: Defeated Ronald Draper by decision
1971 Pan-American Games Heavyweight champion

1972 National Golden Gloves Heavyweight Champion

Pro career

Bobick trained hard to start his pro career, which did not begin until the spring of 1973. He trained with and was managed by heavyweight legend Joe Frazier. Bobick's first match was against Tommy Burns. He sent Burns to the canvas four times on his way to a first-round KO. Bobick had 14 other fights in 1973, winning them all by KO, including a win over former contender Manuel Ramos.  Bobick won his first 19 fights by knockout.

He had 10 more fights in 1974, winning them all again, eight by KO. Knockout wins that year included Ted Gullick and future champion Mike Weaver. He also decisioned veteran boxer Billy Daniels. With a 25–0 record and 23 KOs he was then rated as the sport's new "White Hope", taking that label from then-declining Jerry Quarry. Frazier himself was approaching retirement and focusing on upcoming paydays with protégé Bobick.

Bobick gained top-10 ranking in 1975 with eight more fights and wins, all again by KO. He was now being dodged by some, but a win over Randy Neumann proved he could not be ignored. He had a tentative contract with Muhammad Ali in 1976, but the fight never materialized. Instead he met and defeated lower ranked contender Larry Middleton, fellow Minnesotan Scott LeDoux, Bunny Johnson and veteran Chuck Wepner among his five 1976 fights, all wins with two KOs.

The Norton fight
Having a 38–0 record with 32 KOs he fought the future champion Ken Norton in a prime time network television bout in May 1977. Both fighters appeared tight and cautious from the opening bell. Norton suddenly connected with an unexpected overhand right flush onto Bobick's chin. He staggered wildly unable to clinch and avoid Norton's furious assault.  

Norton trapped Bobick in a corner landing several roundhouse rights.  One of the punches that connected was a right uppercut that caught Bobick in the throat.  Staggered, blind from his tearing eyes as a result of the throat punch and walloped by another huge right hand, Bobick went to the canvas face first. He rose as the count reached ten. Bobick swayed on unsteady legs and the bout was stopped. The fight officially lasted just 58 seconds, but the actual length of the contest was about 70 seconds. Trainer Joe Frazier, who had previously sparred with Norton, apparently had advised Bobick not to take the fight.

Comeback
Despite the embarrassing defeat, Bobick was back in the ring two months later, winning a rematch with Scott LeDoux. He finished the year 1977 at 40–1 with 34 KOs.

In 1978, he was upset in the third round by South African Kallie Knoetze for his second KO loss, again falling victim to an overhand right. Cut over his right eye and floored, Bobick rose at the count of 8 but the fight was stopped. He fought eight more times against second-tier fighters in 1978, winning all by KO.

He was then looking to return to top-level contention in 1979 securing a nationally televised bout with future belt-holder and Stevenson's 1976 Olympic KO victim John Tate. Bobick talked openly pre-bout of his new commitment to training and conditioning, citing reduced body fat statistics as proof of his seriousness to return to the top of the heavyweight ranks. Hurt early in the first round by an overhand right as in the Norton fight, Bobick couldn't clinch to clear his head and continued to move forward absorbing terrible punishment. A knockdown followed by a dozen overhand rights from Tate forced the referee to stop the bout a little over two minutes into the first round. 
A TKO loss (stopped due to deep cuts on both eyelids) to prospect George Chaplin later that year led to his retirement at age 28.

Professional boxing record

Life after boxing
Bobick returned to Minnesota and took heavy industry work before a machine accident nearly killed him in 1997. Both his arms were caught and crushed between huge paper rolls being rotated in a paper mill. He narrowly avoided amputation after a complex surgery to re-attach muscles and tendons and repair skin and bone damage. After this, he went into coaching and public speaking, using his celebrity to try to encourage and help others. In November 2006, Bobick was elected as a city councilman. 

On June 19, 2014, he was inducted into the National Polish-American Sports Hall of Fame in Troy, Michigan.

Personal life
Bobick's younger brother Rodney Bobick was also a heavyweight boxer. He died in a single car crash in 1977.

Bobick suffers from chronic traumatic encephalopathy (also known as dementia pugilistica). Originally diagnosed in 1997 after his arm injury, his progressive decline has been noteworthy in recent years. He was quoted in 2011 by the Morrison County Record saying "I'm not sure I would have gone into boxing back then if I would have known all the effects of head trauma that I know today, but I don’t regret the experience, intense training and discipline I learned from the sport."

References

External links
 Amateur record
 
 Minnesota Boxing Hall of Fame Inductee

1950 births
Living people
People from Little Falls, Minnesota
Heavyweight boxers
Boxers from Minnesota
Pan American Games gold medalists for the United States
Boxers at the 1971 Pan American Games
Olympic boxers of the United States
Boxers at the 1972 Summer Olympics
National Golden Gloves champions
Winners of the United States Championship for amateur boxers
American male boxers
Pan American Games medalists in boxing
Medalists at the 1971 Pan American Games
 United States Navy sailors
Sportspeople with chronic traumatic encephalopathy
American people of Polish descent